Pablo Antonio Toloza Fernández (born 28 May 1971) is a Chilean lawyer who was elected as a member of the Chilean Constitutional Convention.

He was Intendant of Antofagasta Region.

References

External links
 Profile at Chile Constituyente

Living people
1971 births
20th-century Chilean lawyers
21st-century Chilean politicians
Independent Democratic Union politicians
Gabriela Mistral University alumni
Members of the Chilean Constitutional Convention
21st-century Chilean lawyers